Majors Airport  is a city-owned airport  southeast of the central business district of Greenville, in Hunt County, Texas.

Originally named Majors Field, it is home to L3Harris Mission Integration Division (MID), which performs aircraft modification.

History
Majors Airport, named for Lieutenant Truett Majors, the first Hunt County native to perish in World War II, began operations on June 26, 1942, as a training center for the United States Army Air Forces (USAAF).  Lt Majors was killed in the 1942 Battle of the Philippines in January 1942.  Greenville was chosen as a site for the USAAF basic flight-training center due to the efforts of the influential politician Sam Rayburn. The base was dedicated and named on 5 January 1943.

Majors Army Airfield (AAF) was assigned initially to the Gulf Coast Training Center (later Central Flying Command). The airport was at one point the home to approximately 5,000 pilots, support personnel, and civilian employees.  Majors also was a major training base for Women Airforce Service Pilots (WASP)s.  Flying training was performed with Fairchild PT-19s as the primary trainer. Also had several PT-17 Stearmans and a few P-40 Warhawks assigned.

In addition to training USAAF pilots, the airfield was the training site for Escuadrón 201 of the Mexican Air Force.  The training center was reassigned to Second Air Force on 30 November 1944 as a group training center, primary for the assignment of replacement personnel to combat squadrons in Overseas theaters.

Majors AAF was inactivated on 18 July 1945 after the defeat of Germany; the city of Greenville then took ownership, then leased the site to TEMCO (which, after a series of acquisitions, became L-3 Mission Integration Division).

The airport had airline flights (Central DC-3s) for a year or two around 1952.

On 5 March 2014, a regional American Eagle jet heading from Dallas/Fort Worth International Airport made an emergency landing after the pilot reported smoke in the cockpit.  Flight 3400 was bound for Moline, Il., when it was diverted about 9 p.m. to Majors Airport in Greenville. Jim Hogan, a passenger from Iowa City, Iowa, seated in the exit row, opened the door and led the way for the other passengers to disembark.

Facilities
Its one runway, 17/35, is 8,030 by 150 feet (2,448 x 46 m) asphalt.

In the year ending 23 June 2016, the airport had 19,135 aircraft operations, averaging 52 per day: 99% general aviation and 1% military. 42 aircraft were then based at the airport: 86% single-engine, 5% multi-engine, 7% jets, and 2% helicopters.

Accidents and incidents 
 14 July 1994: A Cessna 310Q, registration number N310AE, crashed after an uncontrolled left-hand descent during a practice single-engine go-around, destroying the aircraft and killing the student pilot and certified flight instructor (CFI) aboard. The landing gear was found to have been extended on impact, contrary to the manufacturer's recommended procedure to retract the gear during a go-around. The accident was attributed to "the CFI's failure to maintain minimum airspeed above VMC, resulting in a loss of control during the single engine go-around. Factors were not attaining runway alignment and the CFI's failure to retract the landing gear for the go-around procedure."

See also

 Texas World War II Army Airfields
 32d Flying Training Wing (World War II)

References

Other sources

 
 Manning, Thomas A. (2005), History of Air Education and Training Command, 1942–2002.  Office of History and Research, Headquarters, AETC, Randolph AFB, Texas 
 Shaw, Frederick J. (2004), Locating Air Force Base Sites, History’s Legacy, Air Force History and Museums Program, United States Air Force, Washington DC. 
 Thole, Lou (1999), Forgotten Fields of America : World War II Bases and Training, Then and Now – Vol. 2.  Publisher: Pictorial Histories Pub,

External links
 Airport Homepage
 

1942 establishments in Texas
Airports established in 1942
Airfields of the United States Army Air Forces in Texas
Airports in Texas
Airports in the Dallas–Fort Worth metroplex
 
Transportation in Hunt County, Texas
USAAF Central Flying Training Command
American Theater of World War II